Luoxian Subdistrict is a subdistrict and the seat of Beihu District in Chenzhou Prefecture-level City, Hunan, China. The subdistrict was formed through the amalgamation of Gaobi Village of the former Chenjiang Town, Luoxian Community of Yanquan Subdistrict and 3 villages of the former Shijao Township in April 2012. In May 2016, the subdistrict was divided into 3 communities and 2 villages, its seat is at Luoxianpu.

References

Divisions of Beihu District, Chenzhou
Subdistricts of Hunan
County seats in Hunan